As the Sun Went Down is a 1919 American silent Western film directed by E. Mason Hopper and starring Edith Storey, Lew Cody, and Harry S. Northrup. It was released on February 10, 1919.

Plot
Colonel Billy is an ex-dance hall girl who has now gained a reputation as a gunfighter. She lives on the outskirts of Rattlesnake Gulch, where the women look down on her due to her past, while the men respect her due to her gun. She is in love with Faro Bill, a prospector who has promised to wed Billy once he strikes enough gold. One day the stage brings a preacher, Albert Atherton, and a destitute actor and his wife, Gerald and Mabel Morton, and their infant daughter to town. As a joke on Billy, they send Atherton to her house, saying that she has a room to board. Morton, in order to support his wife and child, files a claim and begins prospecting.

Morton strikes gold, and when word of his strike reaches San Francisco, the gambler Arbuthnot devises a plot to take his claim away from him.  He arrives in Rattlesnake Gulch, and forms a team with a local ne'er-do-well, Pizen Ike, and gets him to agree to help in his plan to cheat Morton out of his claim. Arbuthnot has brought fake love letters from Mabel, and when he reveals them, Ike insults her in front of everyone. Feeling the need to protect his wife's reputation, Morton challenges Ike to a duel. This is falling into place as Arbuthnot had predicted. Once Ike kills Morton in the duel, they'll be able to take over the claim.

However, Billy learns of the duel and insists she step into the duel and take the place of Morton, many in the town support her, especially Faro Bill. Resistant at first, Ike agrees.  But when he has the opportunity, he sneaks up behind Bill and strikes him over the head. Thinking him dead, he casts him into a crevice. Bill wakes up and begins to dig his way out of the crevice.  In the process, he strikes a gold vein. He gets back to town just in time for the duel between Billy and Ike. His presence jars Ike, and Billy wounds him, and he begins to run away. Bill follows him and shoots him again in the shoulder, but the impact causes him to stumble and fall off a cliff.

Exposed, Arbuthnot admits that the letters were forged, and Mabel's name is no longer besmirched. In the aftermath of the duel and Ike's death, it is revealed that Bill is Atherton's long lost brother, and Atherton performs the marriage of Billy and Bill.

Cast list
 Edith Storey as Colonel Billy
 Lew Cody as Faro Bill
 Harry S. Northrup as Arbuthnot
 William Brunton as Albert Atherton
 F. A. Turner as Gerald Morton
 Frances Burnham as Mabel Morton
 ZaSu Pitts as Sal Sue
 F. E. Spooner as Gin Mill Jack
 Alfred Hollingsworth as Pizen Ike
 Vera Lewis as Ike's Wife
 George W. Berrell as Piety Pete
 Pop Taylor
 Cal Dugan

Production
The film was released on February 10, 1919.

References

External links 
 
 
 

1919 films
1919 Western (genre) films
American black-and-white films
Films directed by E. Mason Hopper
Metro Pictures films
Silent American Western (genre) films
1910s American films
1910s English-language films